The Mosak sulmani dance is a traditional Indian dance. It originated in Tripura, India as a hunting ritual. The actions of hunting are shown through elaborate gestures.

References

Dances of Tripura